Alex Agbo  (born 1 July 1977) is a Nigerian professional footballer. He currently plays for Sharks FC in the Nigerian Premier League after playing for years in Malaysia.

External links
TFF profile
 

1977 births
Living people
Association football forwards
Nigerian footballers
Nigerian expatriate footballers
Süper Lig players
Samsunspor footballers
Expatriate footballers in Turkey
Seongnam FC players
K League 1 players
Nigerian expatriate sportspeople in South Korea
Jiangsu F.C. players
China League One players
Expatriate footballers in South Korea
Nigerian expatriate sportspeople in Turkey
Expatriate footballers in China
Sharks F.C. players
Nigerian expatriate sportspeople in China
Sportspeople from Jos